Dennis Amos Marshall Maxwell (9 August 1985 – 23 June 2011) was a Costa Rica international footballer who played as a left back.

Club career
Marshall started his career at local side Limonense, before moving to Puntarenas in 2007. He joined Herediano on loan for the 2009 Verano season.

In September 2009 he moved abroad to play for Danish Superliga club AaB.

International career
Marshall made his debut for Costa Rica in a June 2009 FIFA World Cup qualification match against Trinidad and Tobago and earned a total of 19 caps, scoring 1 goal. He represented his country in 4 FIFA World Cup qualification matches and played at the 2009 and 2011 CONCACAF Gold Cups.

His final international was a June 2011 CONCACAF Gold Cup match against Honduras.

International goals
Scores and results list. Costa Rica's goal tally first.

Personal life
Marshall was a son of Dennis Marshall Herron, a former Costa Rica national team player.

Death
Marshall had scored the only goal for Costa Rica five days earlier in a match against Honduras in the quarterfinals of the 2011 CONCACAF Gold Cup.

His death was marked in several ways in his home country. The president of Costa Rica, Laura Chinchilla, went on national television and expressed her sympathy and a memorial ceremony was held in Estadio Eladio Rosabal Cordero, the stadium of Marshall's former club, CS Herediano.

References

External links 
 Official Danish Superliga stats 
 CS Herediano profile
 

1985 births
2011 deaths
People from Limón Province
Association football defenders
Costa Rican footballers
Costa Rica international footballers
2009 CONCACAF Gold Cup players
2011 Copa Centroamericana players
2011 CONCACAF Gold Cup players
Puntarenas F.C. players
C.S. Herediano footballers
AaB Fodbold players
Costa Rican expatriate footballers
Expatriate men's footballers in Denmark
Road incident deaths in Costa Rica